In Greek mythology, Candalus (Ancient Greek: Κάνδαλος Kándalos) was one of the Heliadae, a son of Rhodos and Helios. Candalus, along with his brothers, Triopas, Macar and Actis, were jealous of another brother, Tenages, and so they murdered him. After the murder came to light, Candalus fled Rhodes to Cos.

Notes

References 

 Diodorus Siculus, The Library of History translated by Charles Henry Oldfather. Twelve volumes. Loeb Classical Library. Cambridge, Massachusetts: Harvard University Press; London: William Heinemann, Ltd. 1989. Vol. 3. Books 4.59–8. Online version at Bill Thayer's Web Site
 Diodorus Siculus, Bibliotheca Historica. Vol 1-2. Immanel Bekker. Ludwig Dindorf. Friedrich Vogel. in aedibus B. G. Teubneri. Leipzig. 1888-1890. Greek text available at the Perseus Digital Library.

Children of Helios
Demigods in classical mythology
Rhodian characters in Greek mythology